The first season of Blue Bloods, an American police procedural–family drama television series, aired in the United States on CBS between September 24, 2010 to May 13, 2011. The series was created and along with Leonard Goldberg and Michael Cuesta, executively produced by Robin Green and Mitchell Burgess. The show revolves around the Reagan family, consisting of the retired police commissioner, current police commissioner, police officers, and an assistant district attorney, all working with the New York City Police Department (NYPD). Actors Donnie Wahlberg, Bridget Moynahan, Will Estes, Len Cariou and Tom Selleck make up the main cast as the Reagan family—Danny, Erin, Jamie, Henry and Frank.

Blue Bloods first season aired during the 2010–11 television season on Fridays at 10:00 p.m. EST. The series debuted with the pilot episode, which was viewed by 13.01 million viewers. The season ended with the finale "The Blue Templar", which was watched by 11.79 million viewers. The season averaged 12.58 million viewers per 22 episodes. Internationally, the first season was very successful in Canada, United Kingdom and New Zealand, ranking among the top 30 most watched programs on the respective channels. The first season also garnered positive reviews from television critics, praising the performances of lead actors Donnie Wahlberg and Tom Selleck and the family dynamic among the Reagans.

A running theme through the first season is Jamie's assumption of Joe's investigation. The FBI tried to recruit Jamie, but instead he conducted his own covert investigation into Joe's murder. The corrupt cops were operating within a fraternal organization called the "Blue Templar", and murdered Joe when his covert investigation was getting close to exposing names. Joe's assailants attempt to kill Jamie by sabotaging the brakes in his car; however, this effort backfired. After the failed hit, Jamie informs Frank, Danny, and grandfather Henry about the results of his informal investigation. Along with Frank's prosecutor daughter Erin, the Reagan family completes Joe's Blue Templar investigation. After gathering sufficient evidence to obtain arrest warrants, Frank personally leads a squad of police officers, including Danny and Jamie, to execute the warrant. They arrest the corrupt cops while they are having a covert meeting to divide stolen drug money. The group's leader, a detective named Sonny Malevsky, admits to killing Joe. After his confession, Malevsky commits suicide with his service pistol.

The entire season was released on DVD in Region 1 on September 13, 2011, Region 2 on September 19, 2011 and Region 4 on September 15, 2011.

Production
The first season of Blue Bloods was produced by Panda Productions, Paw In Your Face Productions and CBS Productions. The series aired in the United States on CBS Friday nights at 10:00 P.M. EST and Canada on CTV via simulcast. Internationally, season one aired in New Zealand on TV3 Saturday nights at 9:30 P.M., in Australia on Network Ten for the first twelve episodes (Wednesday nights at 8:30 P.M. for the first six and Friday nights at 9:30 P.M.) and on One for the rest of the season. In a deal with CBS Studios International, the series was acquired by the UK channel Sky Atlantic on January 5, 2011 and was one of the first series to air on the new channel, which launched on February 1, 2011. The series was created by Mitchell Burgess and Robin Green and executive produced by Burgess, Green, producer Leonard Goldberg and director Michael Cuesta. The show was initially run by director Ken Sanzel, but Sanzel left in August 2010 amid alleged creative tension with series star Tom Selleck. Staff directors for the season include Cuesta, Félix Alcalá, Jan Eliasberg, Karen Gaviola, Stephen Gyllenhaal, Ralph Hemecker, Gwyneth Horder-Payton, Frederick K. Keller, Matt Penn, John Polson, Michael Pressman, Rosemary Rodriguez, and Alex Zakrzewski. Episodes were written by a team of writers, which consisted of Burgess, Green, Brian Burns, Siobhan Byrne-O'Connor, Amanda Green, Julie Hébert, Thomas Kelly, Gwendolyn M. Parker, Mark Rosner, Ken Sanzel, Diana Son, and Kevin Wade. Cinematographers hired for the season included Craig DiBona, David Insley, Tim Ives and Teodoro Maniaci. Composers Mark Morgan and Rob Simonsen provided the background music for the season.

Cast
The first season featured a cast of five main actors who received star billing. Tom Selleck portrays Francis "Frank" Reagan, the patriarch of the Reagan family, a former Marine, and current Police Commissioner who is notably silent about his political beliefs. Donnie Wahlberg acted as Frank's eldest son Daniel "Danny" Reagan, a hard-nosed NYPD Detective and former Marine who often roughs up his suspects, despite being prohibited to do so. Bridget Moynahan portrays Frank's daughter Erin Reagan-Boyle, an assistant district attorney who abides by the law in her dealings with criminal justice. Will Estes portrayed Frank's youngest son Jamison "Jamie" Reagan, a rookie police officer and graduate from Harvard Law before entering the police academy. Len Cariou played Frank's father Henry Reagan, a retired police commissioner and former Marine who, like Danny, is very vocal about his political beliefs.

In addition to the regular cast, the season also featured actors who received the "also starring" billing, appearing in almost every episode of the season. Jennifer Esposito portrayed Jackie Curatola, an NYPD detective at the precinct and Danny's partner. Nicholas Turturro portrayed Sergeant Anthony Renzulli, Jamie's partner and mentor, who had been a partner of Joe Reagan.

Several recurring characters appeared in the first season. Amy Carlson appeared as Linda Reagan, Danny's wife and mother of two children Jack and Sean. Sami Gayle portrayed Erin's teenage daughter Nicole "Nikki" Reagan-Boyle (Marlene Lawston played this role in the pilot episode). Abigail Hawk portrayed Abigail Baker, Frank's primary aide. Brothers Andrew and Tony Terraciano portray Sean and Jack Reagan, Danny and Linda's sons. Gregory Jbara acted as Garrett Moore, the NYPD's Deputy Commissioner of Public Information. Robert Clohessy played Sgt. Sidney Gormley, the immediate supervisor of Danny and the other detectives at the precinct. Actress Dylan Moore appeared in the first eight episodes as Jamie's short-lasting fiancée Sydney Davenport. Bruce Altman portrayed Mayor Frank Russo, Frank's superior. Andrea Roth appeared in four episodes as Kelly Davidson, a television news reporter who dated Frank. Yvonna Kopacz Wright portrayed Ava Hotchkiss, a detective at the precinct and Danny's temporary partner. Noelle Beck appeared in three episodes as Frank's Deputy Press Secretary Sue Connors. Nick Sandow recurred in four episodes as Lieutenant Alex Bello, an officer at Internal Affairs. Michael T. Weiss portrayed Sonny Malevsky, a detective who had worked with Joe Reagan before his murder. Colleen Clinton appeared as Agent Anderson, an FBI agent who attempts to recruit Jamie for her investigation into the Blue Templar. Bobby Cannavale appeared in three episodes as Charles Rosselini, Erin's boss who becomes romantically involved with her. Robert John Burke portrayed Jyle Hogan in three episodes.

Main cast 
Tom Selleck as Police Commissioner Francis "Frank" Reagan
Donnie Wahlberg as Detective 1st Grade Daniel "Danny" Reagan
Bridget Moynahan as ADA Erin Reagan
Will Estes as Officer Jamison "Jamie" Reagan
Len Cariou as Henry Reagan

Recurring cast 
Jennifer Esposito as Detective 1st Grade Jackie Curatola
Abigail Hawk as Detective 1st Grade Abigail Baker
Robert Clohessy as Sergeant Sidney "Sid" Gormley
Abigail Hawk as Detective 1st Grade Abigail Baker
Gregory Jbara as Deputy Commissioner of Public Information Garrett Moore
 Nicholas Turturro as Sargant Anthony Renzulli 
Amy Carlson as Linda Reagan 
Tony Terraciano as Jack Reagan 
Andrew Terraciano as Sean Reagan

Reception

Viewership and ratings
Blue Bloods premiered with the pilot episode, which attracted 13.01 million viewers. After four episodes, the season received a full order of 22 episodes. The series was the most watched program on Friday nights during its duration and was the second most watched program during its short move to the Wednesday timeslot. Apart from the pilot episode, the most-watched episode of the season was "Little Fish", which accrued a viewership of 12.30 million viewers. The season finale was watched by 11.78 million viewers. The season averaged over 12.58 million viewers and a 7.8/14 household rating, becoming the 19th most-watched series of the 2010-2011 primetime television season. In the 18-49 adult demographic, the season averaged a 2.2 Nielsen rating, equating to 2.88 million viewers and ranking number 85th for the 2010-2011 primetime television season.

In Canada, Blue Bloods stood as a solid performer on CTV, landing within the top twenty of the top programs in Canada. The show ended its first season as the most watched new drama series as well as second most watched new series of the season. The season ranked number five in the 18-49 and 25-54 age demographics. In the United Kingdom, the series was among the weekly top five most viewed program on Sky Atlantic, amassing an audience between 450,000 and 630,000 viewers. In Australia, the series premiered with a strong 1.11 million viewers, but viewership fell to 288,000 viewers by April, prompting Network Ten to move the series to its HD channel One, which premiered the second half of the season on October 31, 2011.

Critical reviews
Upon the premiere of the pilot episode, the series received positive reviews from television critics. At Metacritic, which assigns a weighted mean rating out of 100 to reviews from television critics, the show received an average score of 70, which indicates "generally favorable review", based on 25 reviews. Reviews for the full season were generally positive. 

Nick Hartel of DVD Talk deemed the DVD release of the season as "Recommended", writing that it "should wisely be approached as a family drama that utilizes the police angle as a common bonding element." Hartel lauded Selleck, Wahlberg and Cariou's performances and the family dinners, noting that "the arguments and interruptions that garnish the meals give "Blue Bloods" its most human qualities." Hartel also noted that the series "quickly resort to genre story staples", adding that the "identity crisis of cop drama versus family drama results in the former getting the short end of the stick with many cases feeling like an afterthought or plot contrivance for the Reagans to discuss at the weekly family dinner." C.S. Stonebridge of The Numbers wrote, "The regular crimes are also intriguing enough to carry most episodes, although there were a few too many times where there were pretty big coincidences that strained credibility. But this storyline made watching each episode more important, as opposed to a show like Law & Order, where you could almost literally grab any episode in the show's 20 year run and watch it without having to have seen any of the earlier episodes to know what's going on." Stuart Cummins of What Culture called the series "entertaining police drama that combines the best elements of shows such as Numbers, CSI and Law & Order with the family crises and dramas found in shows like Brothers & Sisters." Chuck Barney of San Jose Mercury News found the cases on the series to "don't carry much of a wow factor" and the show overall lacked "the kind of grittiness that might make it more powerful." Barney however praised the actors' performances and the family dynamic of the Reagans.

Some reviewers, however, share mixed to negative opinion concerning the shows format. DVD Verdict writer Adam Arseneau wrote positively about the season, praising the actors' performances, the family dynamic and the multi-generational police family plot while deeming the family dinners and the lessons doled out from them "smacks of self-righteousness and lazy writing." Arseneau concluded about the season, "If we had genuinely solid material to engage the Reagans, Blue Bloods could be one of the best cop shows on television. As it stands, it rarely transcends average." David Brown from Radio Times gave the season release three stars (out of five), writing "Imagine something that mixes the best elements of Law & Order and Brothers & Sisters and you get the idea." The Guardian writer Michael Hann wrote negatively of the series, noting that "one can know what is happening without even watching the show, since each episode follows the same template."

Episodes

Ratings

United States

Canada

United Kingdom
All viewing figures and ranks are sourced from BARB.

Australia

DVD release

References

External links

2010 American television seasons
2011 American television seasons
Blue Bloods (TV series)